The Reventazón River,, is a river in Costa Rica.

Geography 

It starts at the base of the Irazú Volcano, passing through the east side of the Central Valley, and flows through the Orosí and Turrialba Valleys. After reaching the Caribbean coastal plains it joins the Parismina River and forms what is called the Reventazón-Parismina.

Economy

Water supply 

In its upper segments, the Reventazón River is the source of 25% of the drinking water of Costa Rica's largest metropolitan area centered on San Jose.

Hydropower generation 

The river is very important for power generation. Three reservoirs in the river, Lake Cachí (100.8 MW), Angostura (177MW) and Reventazón Dam (305.5MW) are used for generating a significant share of Costa Rica's electricity.  The dam for the third reservoir, Reventazón (305MW), was completed and opened in 2016.  The river is also important for tourism, specially for whitewater rafting.

Tourism 

Rafting is practiced in the river, which has Class 2-3 rapids in its Florida section.

Ecosystem 

The bobo mullet (Joturus pichardi) is native to the Parismina River and is fished here for subsistence consumption and sometimes commercially.

See also
 Codo del Diablo murders

References

Rivers of Costa Rica